Andrés Már Jóhannesson (born 21 December 1988) is a retired Icelandic footballer who played as a midfielder for Fylkir.

Club career

Andrés was born in Reykjavík. He made his debut for Haugesund on 3 August 2011 against Sogndal, in a 4–0 win.

In 2013, he was loaned out to his former club Fylkir but Haugesund recalled him back in August. In 2014, he completed a permanent move back to Fylkir signing a two-year contract.

Career statistics

References

1988 births
Living people
Andres Mar Johannesson
Andres Mar Johannesson
Andres Mar Johannesson
Andres Mar Johannesson
Johannesson, Andres Mar
Andres Mar Johannesson
FK Haugesund players
Andres Mar Johannesson
Eliteserien players
Andres Mar Johannesson
Andres Mar Johannesson
Andres Mar Johannesson